Til or TIL may refer to:

People

With the given name
 Til Brugman (1888–1958) Dutch author, poet, and linguist
 Til Schweiger (born 1963), German actor and filmmaker
 Til Wykes (born 1953), English psychologist and author

With the surname
 Cornelius Van Til (1895–1987), Dutch-American Christian philosopher
 Guus Til (born 1997), Zambian-born Dutch professional football player
 Sonny Til (1928–1981), American singer, lead singer of The Orioles

Places
 Til, Ardabil, a village in Iran
 Til, East Azerbaijan, a village in Iran

Science and technology
 Til (plant), a tree
 Til, an Urdu word for sesame
 Transparent Intensional Logic, a logical system
 Tumor-infiltrating lymphocytes, white blood cells that have migrated towards a tumor
 Threaded-interpreted language, a threaded code computing execution model

Other uses
 Til (novel), by José de Alencar
 r/todayilearned, a discussion category on Reddit in which the headline of each topic starts with "TIL"
 Tromsø IL, a Norwegian football team

See also
 Thil (disambiguation)
 Till (disambiguation)
 Tilo (disambiguation)